Ed Horstman is an American naval architect and multihull sailboat designer.  He was born in Kalispell, Montana.  He made his way from Montana to California via the U.S. Air Force where was trained as a helicopter mechanic before serving 4 years in Korea.  After the war on the GI Bill Ed attended  the Northrop Institute of Technology where, he  earned a bachelor of science degree in Aeronautical Engineering.  He then worked for aviation giants like Boeing, Douglas Aircraft (on the A4 program), and North American Aircraft where he did wind tunnel tests for the XB-70 supersonic bomber.  Horstman designed his first trimaran after seeing an ad clipping for Piver trimarans.  Ed wrote to Piver requesting information on his 35' trimaran, but never received an answer, so a friend, said, "You're an engineer, why don't you design one."  Before starting, Ed took two courses on hydrodynamics from the University of Southern California before building a scale model out of foam with removable amas to determine the maximum beam and buoyancy.  The model did not have a movable rudder, and when a gust of wind hit the model hard and it turned into the wind, he knew he got the design right. When he could not find a mathematical model to predict the stress on the beams, he again built models of the beams and put them through a battery of stress tests until he was satisfied that his scantlings were strong enough.  Ed started the construction of his first trimaran, a 40 footer with $600 that he borrowed from his grandmother in 1961.

See also
 Arthur Piver

References

Multihull designers
Year of birth missing (living people)
Living people
Place of birth missing (living people)